The 2022–23 Purdue Boilermakers women's basketball team represented Purdue University during the 2022–23 NCAA Division I women's basketball season. The Boilermakers, led by second-year head coach Katie Gearlds, played their home games at Mackey Arena and were a member of the Big Ten Conference.

Previous season
They finished the season 17–15 and 7–11 in Big Ten play to finish in a tie for ninth place.  As the ninth seed in the Big Ten tournament, they were defeated by Michigan State in the second round. They received an at-large bid to the  WNIT.  They defeated  in the First Round before losing to Marquette in the Second Round to end their season.

Roster

Schedule and results
Source:

|-
!colspan=6 style=| Exhibition

|-
!colspan=6 style=| Regular season

|-
!colspan=6 style=| Big Ten Women's Tournament

|-
!colspan=6 style=| NCAA Women's Tournament

Rankings

*The preseason and week 1 polls were the same.^Coaches did not release a week 2 poll.

References

Purdue Boilermakers women's basketball seasons
Purdue
Purdue
Purdue
Purdue